Tây Ninh is a province in the Southeast region of Vietnam, with the capital at the town of Tây Ninh.

Tây Ninh province locates between Ho Chi Minh City and Phnom Penh, in Southern Key Economic Zone. Tây Ninh City is 99 km away from Ho Chi Minh City following National Route 22 and 40 km away from the border with Cambodia to the northwest.

Followers of the Cao Dai, who dominate the area, have built a Holy See in Tây Ninh. The region also has concentrations of the Hòa Hảo, a rival Buddhist sect. The area is noted for its large rubber and sugar plantations; rice and coconuts are also harvested.

The province has a population of 1,169,165 (in 2019) and an area of 4,041.4 km2.

Geography
Like other Southeast provinces, Tây Ninh province is in the middle terrain of South Central Coast Highland and Mekong Delta, the terrain is relatively flat. Tây Ninh not only has highland terrain, but also has flat terrain such as Black Virgin Mountain with the height of 986 m, Phung Mountain (435 m), Heo Mountain (289 m), Tan Bien National Revolutionary Martyrs' Cemetery or Hill 82 (82 m). Terrain of south districts is about 15 m height, while river source of Dầu Tiếng Lake and some places in Tân Châu District is about 115 m, flat terrain and floodplain is 1 m, but the average height in Tây Ninh province is just about 35 m. Overall, terrain's height of Tây Ninh province is lower than that of other Southeast provinces, except Ho Chi Minh City.

History
The Vietnamese began to settle in the then Khmer territory in 1770. The Cao Đài religion originated in Tây Ninh. It is the birthplace of Trình Minh Thế, a nationalist and military leader during the end of the First Indochina War.

Because of the once-vaunted political and military power of the Cao Dai, this region was the scene of prolonged and heavy fighting during the First Indochina War. Tây Ninh province served as a major terminus of the Ho Chi Minh trail during the Vietnam War, and in 1969 the Viet Cong captured Tây Ninh town and held it for several days. During the period of conflict between Cambodia and Vietnam in the late 1970s, the Khmer Rouge launched a number of cross-border raids into Tây Ninh province and committed atrocities against civilians. Several cemeteries around Tây Ninh are stark reminders of these events.

Economy
In 2016–18, the province has reduced its rice and cassava growing areas and increased growing high-value fruits, according to the province's Department of Agriculture and Rural Development. The fruits include longan, grapefruit, durian, mango and soursop. During the period, the province's fruit growing area had a growth rate of 9.1 per cent a year, taking the province's total fruit area to 20,212ha by the end of 2018. The province has about 1,300ha of fruits, including soursop, grapefruit, pineapple, banana and dragon fruit, which are grown under VietGAP standards.

Chairwoman of the National Assembly Nguyễn Thị Kim Ngân lauded Tây Ninh for its efforts in socioeconomic development, with the gross regional domestic product (GRDP) growing 8.5 per cent in 2018 and the provincial competitiveness index ranked 14th out of the 63 cities and provinces, up five places from 2017. Alongside economic development, the province should pay attention to sustainable environmental protection, especially sewage and forest environment issues. Urging the locality to pay due attention to the fight against smuggling, trade fraud, and counterfeit goods through border gates, Prime Minister Nguyễn Xuân Phúc stressed the need to combining socioeconomic development with ensuring defense and security in border areas.

Tây Ninh province owns 9 industrial parks included the list of Vietnam industrial zone until 2015 and the vision of 2020, with a total natural land area of 4,485 ha. So far, 5 IPs have been established including: Trang Bang IP (190ha), Linh Trung industrial and processing zone No. III (203ha); Bourbon An Hoa IP (760 ha), Phuoc Đong IP (2,190 ha), Cha La IP – phase I (42 ha), with a total natural land area of 3,385 ha, the industrial land area for lease to construct workshop is 2,162 ha.

In 2019, The Ministry of Transport, the Ho Chi Minh City People's Committee and the Tây Ninh provincial People's Committee held a conference in Ho Chi Minh City on October 26 to sign a coordination plan on the construction of the Ho Chi Minh City-Moc Bai highway. The highway, which is being implemented under a public-private partnership, will connect the city with Moc Bai International Border Gate in the southern province of Tay Ninh. The Moc Bai International Border Gate in Tây Ninh province has international exchanges with Cambodia and Thailand. National Road 22 is the only road linking HCM City with Mộc Bài. A survey conducted in 2017 showed that 39,700 vehicles traveled on the road each day, and that its designed loading capacity was 40,000 per day. Construction of the HCM City-Moc Bai Expressway is slated to be completed by 2025 with at least four lanes and expanded to six or eight lanes by 2045.

Administrative divisions
Tây Ninh is subdivided into nine district-level sub-divisions:

 6 districts:

 Bến Cầu
 Châu Thành
 Dương Minh Châu
 Gò Dầu
 Tân Biên
 Tân Châu

 2 towns:
 Hòa Thành
 Trảng Bàng
 1 provincial city:
 Tây Ninh (capital)

They are further subdivided into 6 commune-level towns (or townlets), 71 communes, and 17 wards.

Climate

Festival
 Black Virgin Mountain Festival (from the 15th to the 18th day of the first lunar month; Via Ba Festival lasting from the 5th to the 6th day of the fifth lunar month)
 Hội Yến Diêu Trì (annually held in Tây Ninh Holy See or Cao Dai Holy See on the 15th of the eighth lunar month)

References

External links
 Official Tây Ninh Province website
 

 
Southeast (Vietnam)
Provinces of Vietnam